Art of War Undisputed Arena Fighting Championship: Art of War 1 was the inaugural mixed martial arts event by the mixed martial arts organization Art of War Undisputed Arena Fighting Championship. The event took place on Saturday, March 9, 2007 at the American Airlines Center in Dallas, Texas.  The card aired on HDTV.

History 
The fight card included Pedro Rizzo and Justin Eilers in the main event.  The show also featured a bout between Carlo Prater and Anthony Lapsley.
Hosted by Tommy Habeeb

Results

References

2007 in mixed martial arts
Mixed martial arts events
Mixed martial arts in Texas